Julia Alexandratou is a Greek socialite, media personality, glamour model, singer, actress, and pornographic actress. In 2002, at age 16, she won the beauty pageant title "Miss Young" in Greece. Four years later, Alexandratou won the title "Miss Greece International 2006" (also called the "Runner-up Star Hellas 2006") at the Miss Star Hellas beauty pageant. In 2010, a controversial celebrity sex tape featuring Alexandratou was released. She later admitted that she was paid for her participation in the film. In 2011, Alexandratou attracted controversy again, after the release of a second pornographic video.

Biography

Childhood
Alexandratou was born on 24 November 1985, to a father who hails from Kefalonia, named Zissimos Alexandratos and a mother who hails from London, England, named Allison Hunt-Alexandratou. Her father is a mechanical engineer, while her mother is a former fashion model. She also has a sister three years her senior, Artemis Alexandratou.

From a very young age, along with her mother, she modeled in numerous magazines and children's fashion advertisements. She has modeled since the age of four and has also participated and won in a lot of beauty pageants. At age seven, she enrolled in ballet lessons, and later on in vocal and acting training, where she is said to have exhibited great potential. In 2002, at the age of only 16, Alexandratou entered the "Miss Young" beauty pageant where she won first place.

Following family problems, Alexandratou lived in London with her mother for a couple of years. After these times, she pulled back from her artistic training. As a result of living in London as well as her mother's origin, Alexandratou is fluent in the English language.

Career

2006–2009: modeling, hosting, and music
In 2006, Alexandratou participated in the 17th edition of the annual Miss Star Hellas beauty pageant which took place on 9 April 2006 (semi-final) and 11 April 2006 (final). Alexandratou failed to take first place in the pageant, while her negative facial reaction to the results on screen, were ridiculed by the media.

She made her first appearance after the competition on a live show of the Greek reality show Fame Story 4, and was a guest singer on the Greek song, "Mono Ya Sena" (Only For You) with Fame Story 3 contestant Andreas Constantinidis. The duet was featured as the first single on his debut album, while they also filmed a music video together for the song.

A few months later, Alexandratou became a co-host to the hit Greek TV show Megalicious Chart Live!, alongside MAD TV presenter Themis Georgandas. During that period, she made many television appearances, and in the course of one year, appeared on over 10 magazine covers, including magazines such as Vogue, Nitro, Diva and Celebrity.

Her subsequent fame led to her hosting a TV show called Music Bee, along with her friend Stathis Etiatoglou. The show debuted to high expectations, with a format focusing on music news in Greece and abroad. However, ratings of the show soon dropped.

In 2007, she released two singles with Sony Music Entertainment Greece titled I Vassilissa tis Pistas (The Queen of the Dance Floor) and Stohos Ine ta Lefta (The Target Is Money), respectively. That same year, Alexandratou made her film debut in a Greek comedy directed by Nikos Perakis, playing the role of a singer named Areti. Stohos Ine ta Lefta served as the theme song to the film.

In April 2008, Alexandratou posed on the cover of Nitro magazine, assuming the role of Marilyn Monroe. She was voted by readers of the magazine as the best choice to perform the special edition spread. In the autumn of the same year, she started performing in her first concert appearances at an Athenian nightclub alongside Greek singer Panos Kalidis. In late 2008, she released her single Honolulu, which is a cover of a song written by Nikos Karvelas. Karvelas later expressed outrage that the song was covered without his consent.

2010–present: pornographic videos
On 3 March 2010, a DVD depicting Alexandratou having sex with a then-unidentified male began being sold in many spots around Greece. The man's face can't be seen throughout the entire video and for a period after the DVD's release there was an unconfirmed rumor that the man is pornographic actor Ian Scott. When first asked by reporters about this video, Alexandratou and her manager, Menios Fourthiotis, stated that this was the first time they heard about it and that they thought that it was a joke or a blackmail attempt.

Nevertheless, the owner of Sirina Entertainment (the company which distributed the DVD), Dimitris Sirinakis, stated: "I can't reveal how or from whom I got the sex tape, but I can assure you that it was obtained legally." A day after its release, over 200,000 copies of the DVD were said to have been sold. Shortly after the DVD's release, Alexandratou appeared on one of Star Channel's newscasts, on which she claimed that the pornographic video was filmed exclusively for personal use and she also stated, without revealing the unidentified man's real identity, that his first name was Giorgos and that it was him who leaked the video, to harm her public image.

On 17 March 2010, Alexandratou appeared on Greek host Tatiana Stefanidou's TV show Axizi na to Dis, on which she admitted that she was paid in advance for her participation in the video, thus confirming that it is a professional pornographic video and not an amateur one. The DVD sold over 100,000 copies at news stands.

The rumor that the unidentified man is Scott was confirmed by Scott himself, who appeared on the episode of Greek host Themos Anastassiadis's TV show Ola 10 aired on 3 May 2010, on which he admitted that he was Alexandratou's sex partner in the video.

On 15 May 2010, Alexandratou, Scott and Fourthiotis appeared together at the "Athens Erotica" adult entertainment show, held in Athens, where Alexandratou and Scott publicly kissed each other.

On 29 November 2010, Alexandratou began hosting a once weekly show on local Athenian television station Extra 3.

On 4 February 2011, a second DVD produced by Sirina Entertainment was released in Greece with Alexandratou starring along with two male black pornographic actors. The DVD is considered a sequel of the first video, since it is titled Julia 2 Mavri (Julia 2 Blacks). In the adult film, Julia appears to walk naked in the streets of Voula seeking for love, which she eventually finds. The scenes feature explicit sexual acts, in the form of hardcore pornography.

Personal life
Alexandratou claimed to be in a relationship with famous Greek star-manager and celebrity Elias Psinakis, the ex-manager of Greek singer Sakis Rouvas. The two were introduced in the spring of 2006 after the pageant. Psinakis was one of the judges on the Greek reality show Dream Show, where her sister Artemis was a contestant. In January 2007, Psinakis posed on the cover of an issue of the Greek magazine Trypaki. Julia conducted an interview for this issue, in which they both announced their relationship. In late 2009, she bought a house in Ekali, a suburb of Athens.

Discography

Singles
 Mono Gia Sena (duet with Andreas Konstantinidis) (2006)
 I Vassilissa tis Pistas (2007)
 Stohos Ine ta Lefta (2007)
 Honolulu (2008)

Music videos
 Mono Gia Sena (2006)
 I Vassilissa tis Pistas (2007)
 Psychremia: Main Theme (2007)
 Stohos Ine ta Lefta (2007)
 Honolulu (2008)

Filmography
 Psychremia (2007)

Adult films
 Julia Alexandratou: To Apagorevmeno (2010)
 Julia 2 Mavri (2011)
 Elliniko Andriko Casting (2011)

Photoshoots for magazines
 Nitro
 Miss Diva
 Miss Lux
 Esquire
 Playboy
 Hello!
 Vogue

References

External links

1986 births
Living people
Greek beauty pageant winners
Greek female models
21st-century Greek women singers
Greek pop singers
Greek people of English descent
People from Athens